
This is a timeline of Mongolian history, comprising important legal and territorial changes and political events in Mongolia and its predecessor states.  To read about the background to these events, see History of Mongolia.  See also the list of presidents of Mongolia.

 Centuries: 17th18th19th20th21st

3rd century BC

2nd century BC

1st century BC

1st century AD

2nd century AD

3rd century AD

4th century AD

5th century AD

6th century AD

7th century AD

8th century AD

9th century AD

10th century AD

11th century AD

12th century AD

13th century

14th century

15th century

16th century

17th century

18th century

19th century

20th century

21st century

See also
History of Mongolia
Proto-Mongols
List of Mongol states
List of Mongol rulers
List of heads of state of Mongolia
List of historical cities and towns of Mongolia
Mongolian nobility

References

Bibliography

External links
John Stewart Bowman "Columbia Chronologies of Asian History and Culture"
Jill Lawless, Wild East: Travels in the New Mongolia (ECW Press, Toronto, 2000). 
Morris Rossabi, Modern Mongolia: From Khans to Commissars to Capitalists (University of California Press, Berkeley and Los Angeles, California, 2005).